Jagiellonia Białystok is a Polish football club based in Białystok that plays in the Ekstraklasa, the top level of Polish football. The club was founded in 1920 by soldiers in the Reserve Battalion in Białystok. Jagiellonia play their home games at Stadion Miejski.

The club won the Polish Cup and Super Cup in 2010 and qualified to play in the third round qualification of the UEFA Europa League. It was the club's first appearance in the European cup. The club's most successful seasons were the 2016–17 and 2017–18 seasons when they finished 2nd in the Ekstraklasa.

In 2009, the club was involved in a corruption scandal that almost resulted in their relegation to the II liga; however, instead of being relegated the club was deducted 10 points in the following season.

In the 2018–19 season, Jagiellonia Białystok drew an average home league attendance of 9,458.

History

The establishment of the club
Jagiellonia Białystok was founded by soldiers in the Reserve Battalion of the 42nd Infantry Regiment on May 30, 1920. The team's original name was shortened to KSBZ 42 PP. Their first game was against Kresowcy which they won 5–1.  Later the team name was changed to WKS 42 PP, an abbreviation for Wojskowy Klub Sportowy, which means Army Sport Club. On November 2, 1930 WKS 42PP lost 1–2 against WKS 82 PP for the play-offs to advance to Division 1. January 27, 1932 was the first time Jagiellonia was introduced into the club's name when it was changed to Białystok Sports Club Jagiellonia. The term Jagiellonia refers to the Jagiellonian dynasty which ruled Poland for two centuries. Around the same time, the club's coat of arms was also introduced with its red and yellow colours. In 1938, due to financial problems, the club dissolved and ceased to exist until its reactivation in 1945. Unfortunately, in June the following year, with the new government in place there was no room for Jagiellonia, mostly because of the history with the Bolsheviks in 1920 and the 42nd Infantry Regiment. On January 26, 1957 the merging of Budowlani Białystok and Sparta Białystok reactivated Sports Club Jagiellonia Białystok with the original yellow-red-black crest restored.

Club's crest

The club's crest and colours first appeared in 1932. The original crest consisted of a black, stylized letter "J" and a yellow and cherry red colour shield, while the flag and the jerseys of the club were white and black. It was not until the mid-80s that fans began to use yellow-red as club colours, but official documents at the time still use the white and black colours. Currently, the team's official colours are yellow-red, but in reference to history the team's away colours are white and black.

Jagiellonia before World War II
In 1920–1923 most of the matches Jagiellonia played were either friendlies or small tournaments in Białystok. The club joined the regular league in 1924, starting in klasa B in the Vilnius OZPN district. The season was a success, winning the first season and gaining promotion to klasa A. Due to a pause in the league there were no games in 1925. In 1926, the league started up again with the team being in klasa A. The team was doing well getting third in the following season. Later through the years the match officials were being paid off to make the Białystok team not do well and ultimately get demoted. In 1929, it was decided to change districts where Jagiellonia played to the newly formed Białystok OZPN. In 1930 42PP, the club's name at the time, was the most successful thus far. They appeared in the play-offs for the top division in the country. At the end of the play-offs Jagiellonia and another team, WKS 82 pp Brześć, were tied for points and had to play one more game at a neutral ground to see who was the winner to that season. Jagiellonia fell to WKS 82 pp Brześć 2–1. Jagiellonia did win the district championship that season but it was the last trophy they won before World War II.

A big moment for the team was on January 27, 1932 when the two strongest teams in Białystok merged to create a new club called Białystok Sport club Jagiellonia. It is not known who created the team's new crest but what is known is that it had to do with the history of the Jagiellonian dynasty, Grand Duchy of Lithuania, and pre-partitioned Poland.

1930s
In the mid-thirties Jagiellonia began to experience problems, the city was not able to maintain the club. In 1932, the military stationed in Białystok took an active role in trying to save the club, along with the municipal government in 1936 the club's name changed to Military Sports Club Jagiellonia. Unfortunately, this decision did not solve the problem completely. In 1938, the club joined the A-class 1937/38 season but had to withdraw shortly after due to financial reasons. All the matches were cancelled and all the players were forced to find new clubs. Most of the players joined Sagittarius Białystok another team in Białystok and played there for two seasons before World War II broke out in 1939 and closed the first chapter in the history of the club.

After World War II
After the second world war Jagiellonia was revived mostly in part by Karol Kowalczyński, but the revival was short-lived as the club dissolved on 20 June 1946. In the place of the disbanded Jagiellonia came Motor Białystok, which became the champion of the Białystok region and advanced to the Polish championship in 1946. Next year Motor Białystok joined the struggle for the Polish championship and the right to get into I league. In 1949 Białystok had a new team called Budowlani Białystok and in 1951 Motor Białystok merged into Budowlani Białystok. In 1955 Budowlani Białystok changed its name to BKS Jagiellonia Białystok. On 26 January 1957, a merger of two clubs, Jagiellonia Białystok and Sparta, resulted in a club called Jagiellonia. For the second time in its history Jagiellonia had the host stadium of Stadium Zwierzyniecki.

1970s
In the early 70s the team played in Klasa A and in the district league. The team's situation changed when Michał Urban became coach of the team, players started to go to a modern training camp with modern drills. Many young players started playing for the club, including future representatives for the Polish national team juniors. Grzegorz Bielatowicz joined the club as a scout and found a few young talents from the north-east region, among them was Jerzy Zawiślan who was the 2nd top scorer in the II League 1975–76 season who scored 13 goals. The team started to have some success and were promoted to Division II after winning the promotion play-offs in the 1974–75 season. The team was eventually promoted to League II in 1975, but the success was short-lived after only being there for 3 seasons, Jagiellonia was relegated in 1978. At the end of the 70s Jerzy Bołtuć, Leszek Frelek, Ryszard Karalus and Zbigniew Skoczylas began a large youth project to bring in a strong and young new team.

1980s
In the 1982–83 season, the club, led by Grzegorz Bielatowicz, had a successful run finishing first place with a nine-point advantage over second place, Gwardią Szczytno, promoting the team to Division II. With Olympic silver medalist Janusz Wójcik as coach, the team played a number of good seasons in Division II finishing third in 1986 and the following year was promoted to I Liga for the first time in the club's history.  In addition, the top scorer in the competition was a later representative of Poland, Jacek Bayer who netted 20 times for Jagiellonia.

Ekstraklasa
Matches in the second league in Białystok were already averaging 15 thousand viewers. The first match in the return to Ekstraklasa had estimated 35-40 thousand supporters. Every home match following the first was viewed by no less than 20 thousand fans in the stands. Stories from witnesses said they recall buses of supporters come from villages all over the region. The first few seasons did not turn out well for the Białystok team as they finished 8th twice and then 16th, which meant they were relegated. A year later the team lost the playoffs for promotion in a penalty shoot-out against Zagłębie Sosnowiec. In the following year Jagiellonia finished 2nd place earning them promotion to the Ekstraklasa. After only one season in the first league the team was significantly outclassed and were relegated, where they continued to fall to the 4th league. They did not spend much time in the bottom tiers; within 3 years Jagiellonia was back in the second league.

In 2007, the team advanced to the first tier, where they still are today. The first season back the team finished 14th place with 27 points. The following year was better where the club finished 8th with 34 points. In 2009, the club was punished with a deduction of 10 points following a corruption scandal, committed by the previous president of the club. The first success of the club was the 2009–10 season where Jagiellonia won the Polish Cup, beating Pogon Szczecin thanks to a goal from Andrius Skerla. The 2014–15 season was the second most successful season Jagiellonia saw finishing 3rd place. In the 2016–17 season Jagiellonia were runners up for the first time in the club's history. Jagiellonia won the Polish Cup and finished 3rd and 2nd when coached by Michał Probierz.

Ireneusz Mamrot became the club's new coach in June 2017. With Mamrots' guidance the club won the silver medal as runners up in a very tight race for the Polish championship, thus earning them a spot in the Europa League for the 2nd time in a row.

In January 2019, Rafał Grzyb, having the most caps for the club and long time captain became the club's new assistant coach, officially retiring from playing football. On 23 August 2019, Jesús Imaz scored the first hat-trick in the club's history in the Ekstraklasa.

Team name
Chronology of the team name:
 1920 – WKS 42 Pułk Piechoty Białystok
 1932 – B.K.S. Jagiellonia Białystok
 1935 – W.K.S. Jagiellonia Białystok
 1945 – B.K.S. Jagiellonia Białystok
 1946 – P.K.S. Motor Białystok
 1948 – Klub Sportowy Białystok Wicie
 1949 – Związkowiec Białystok
 1951 – Budowlani Białystok
 1955 – Jagiellonia Białystok Budowlani
 1973 – Jagiellonia Białystok MKSB
 1999 – Jagiellonia Białystok-Wersal Podlaski
 2003 – Jagiellonia Białystok SSA

Current squad

Out on loan

Current staff

Notable players
Albania
  Bekim Balaj 
Bosnia and Herzegovina
  Ensar Arifović
  Bojan Nastić 
Czech Republic
  Martin Pospíšil
Lithuania
  Fedor Černych  
North Macedonia
  Dejan Iliev
Palestine
  Alexis Norambuena
Poland
  Dariusz Bayer
  Bartłomiej Drągowski
  Tomasz Frankowski
  Kamil Grosicki
  Damian Kądzior 
  Michał Pazdan
  Taras Romanczuk
Romania
  Bogdan Țîru

Managers

 Janusz Wójcik (Jan 1, 1986 – Oct 20, 1987)
 Witold Mroziewski (May 15, 1993 – May 11, 1994)
 Bohdan Kucharski (1994)
 Kazimierz Michalczuk (1994)
 Ryszard Karalus (1995–96)
 Leonard Aleksandrów (1996–97)
 Andrzej Kaczewski (1996–97)
 Piotr Wiśnik (1996–97)
 Mirosław Mojsiuszko (1997)
 Algimantas Liubinskas (July 1, 1998 – Dec 31, 1998)
 Grzegorz Szerszenowicz (1998–99)
 Jarosław Bartnowski (1999)
 Witold Mroziewski (July 1, 1999 – June 30, 2000)
 Tadeusz Gaszyński (2000–01)
 Wojciech Łazarek (June 26, 2001 – June 3, 2002)
 Witold Mroziewski (June 3, 2002 – Aug 7, 2004)
 Mirosław Dymek (Aug 7, 2004 – Aug 31, 2004)
 Adam Nawałka (Sept 1, 2004 – April 20, 2006)
 Mirosław Dymek (interim) (April 20, 2006 – April 25, 2006)
 Yuriy Shatalov (April 25, 2006 – June 29, 2006)
 Ryszard Tarasiewicz (June 29, 2006 – April 25, 2007)
 Artur Platek (April 26, 2007 – April 27, 2008)
 Dariusz Czykier (interim) (April 27, 2008 – May 11, 2008)
 Stefan Białas (May 12, 2008 – Sept 14, 2008)
 Michał Probierz (July 5, 2008 – July 22, 2011)
 Czesław Michniewicz (July 22, 2011 – Dec 22, 2011)
 Tomasz Hajto (Jan 9, 2012 – June 21, 2013)
 Piotr Stokowiec (June 17, 2013 – April 7, 2014)
 Michał Probierz (April 7, 2014 – June 4, 2017)
 Ireneusz Mamrot (June 12, 2017 – December 8, 2019)
 Rafał Grzyb (interim) (December 8, 2019 – December 31, 2019)
 Ivaylo Petev (December 30, 2019 – July 31, 2020)
 Bogdan Zając (July 31, 2020 – June 4, 2021)
 Ireneusz Mamrot (June 4, 2021 – December 23, 2021)
 Piotr Nowak (December 31, 2021 – June 10, 2022)
 Maciej Stolarczyk (June 14, 2022 – Present)

Club records

Most appearances
Players with the most appearances for Jagiellonia in Ekstraklasa:

Bold – still active

Top goalscorers
Players with the most goals for Jagiellonia in Ekstraklasa:

Bold – still active

Individual records

Youngest first-team player

Golden boot

Honours and achievements

Domestic 
Polish Cup
 Champions: 2009–10
 Runners-up: 1988–89, 2018–19

Polish SuperCup
 Champions: 2010

I Liga (Second Division)
 Champions: 1986–87

Remes Cup Extra
 Runners-up: 2009, 2010, 2011

Youth Teams
 Polish U-19 Champion: 1988, 1992, 2004, 2011
 Polish U-19 Runner Up: 1981
 Polish U-19 Bronze Medal: 1982, 1996
 Polish U-17 Champion: 2000
 Polish U-17 Runner Up: 2006, 2007, 2010

Jagiellonia Białystok in Europe

All the European games

Jagiellonia Białystok scores are given first in all scorelines.

Retired numbers

21 –  Tomasz Frankowski, striker (1991–1993, 2009–2013)

Ground

Jagiellonia's first formal stadium was constructed in 1971 and had 15,000 seats. Two years later the stadium's capacity was doubled. It was originally named Hetman Białystok stadium or guards stadium. In 2006, the stadium was taken over by the city of Białystok and renamed Stadion Miejski (Municipal Stadium) which is where the club currently plays their home games. In 2008, a French-Polish construction company took on the task of renovating the stadium to become more modern. However, in 2012 due to delays the city terminated the contract with the company and hired a new company to finish the job. Spanish-Polish consortium company was hired to finish the job for a sum of PLN 254 million (US$75 million). The new 22,372 seat stadium was completed at the end of 2014.

Club anthem

The Polish version reads:

In English it is loosely translated to:

Supporters
The official representation of fans in contact with the club is the association of Children of Białystok. The main objective of the association is to unite all fans of Jagiellonia, in the stadium and in everyday life.

An important objective of Children of Białystok is to engage in sporting life, social and cultural, by organizing sporting events and entertainment for children, young people in schools, orphanages, educational centers, and helping people who are in need financially. Other important objectives of the association are:
painting parts of the city of Białystok, and the Podlaskie voivodeship
promote volunteering and to encourage voluntary blood drives
promotion of physical culture, sports, tourism, and a healthy lifestyle
The creation of lighting and different choreography associated with the stadium is due in part by the Ultras Jagiellonia Białystok (UJB).

League results since 1955

Corruption scandal
The questioning of Jagiellonia's involvement in the corruption scandal that went through the Department of Discipline of the Polish Football Association started on June 20, 2008, when the National Prosecutors office in Wrocław handed over documents related to match fixing 6 fixtures in the II Liga of the 2004-05 season of the club. On June 26, 2008 the Department of Discipline postponed the date that would decide the fate of the club. On July 10 there was another extension to the discipline proceedings against the club so the Department of Discipline could get help from the Minister of Justice to faster obtain further documents from the National Prosecutor.

On February 12, 2009, Jagiellonia became the 10th club to be part of the corruption scandal. The Department of Discipline of the PZPN imposed a penalty of relegation of one tier in the following season after the judgement became final of five accounts of sports crime. On March 24, 2009 the club launched an appeal against the decision. The 29th of April 2009 the court repealed the punishment of relegation, instead giving the club 10 negative points the following season and imposed a fine of 300 thousand złoty.

Sponsorship

See also
 Football in Poland
 List of football teams
 Jagiellonia Białystok II

References

External links

 Official website
 Official E-Shop
 jagiellonia.net
 jagiellonia.neostrada.pl 
 Jagiellonia Białystok (90minut.pl)

 
Football clubs in Białystok
1920 establishments in Poland
Association football clubs established in 1920